Selin Sayek Böke (born 24 August 1972) is a Turkish politician, member of the Republican People's Party (CHP), who has served as a Member of Parliament for İzmir's second electoral district since 7 June 2015. She was first elected at the June 2015 general election. She currently serves as the deputy leader of the CHP responsible for economic policies. Born in the United States, she worked in economics, notably as a lecturer and assistant professor at American universities, before moving to Turkey, the country of her parents.

Early life and career
Selin Sayek Böke was born into a Turkish-American family on 24 August 1972 in Buffalo, New York, United States; her father is İskender Sayek and her mother is Füsun Sayek. One part of her family is Antiochian Greek, while another part of her family is Sunni Muslim ethnic Turk from Niğde. She graduated from TED Ankara College in 1989. In 1993, she graduated from Middle East Technical University Faculty of Economics. Between 1993 and 1999, she pursued a master's degree and a doctorate at Duke University in the United States, in the field of economics. She later began teaching at Duke while serving as a project advisor at the World Bank. In her role as an advisor, she worked on World Bank projects in South Africa, north and central Europe. She received her Ph.D from Duke in 1999.

Between 1999 and 2001, she worked at the Bentley University Economics Department as an assistant professor. She later worked at the International Monetary Fund (IMF) office in Washington D.C. as an economist. During her work at the IMF, she also gave lectures at Georgetown University. In 2003, she became a member of teaching staff at Bilkent University. She became an assistant professor in 2010 and became the Chair of the Economics Department at Bilkent University between 2011 and 2014. Between 2013 and 2014, she served as the vice dean of the Bilkent University Faculty of Economic and Administrative Sciences. Since 2011, she is a member of the advisory board at the Scientific and Technological Research Council of Turkey (TÜBİTAK) Social Sciences research Group (SOBAG). She is a founding member of the Füsun Sayek Health and Education Development Foundation.

Academic recognition
Böke's scientific research has been published in several international and national high-profile journals and books. She received an award from TÜBİTAK in 2010 for her work on international economics and effects of foreign investment. In 2007, she received the Excellence Award in Global Economic Affairs from the Kiel World Economics Institute in Germany. In 2011, she was given an award by the Mustafa Parlar Foundation. She has directed several TÜBİTAK research projects.

Political career
In the 18th Republican People's Party Extraordinary Convention held on 6 September 2014, Böke was elected to the Party Council. On 14 September, she was appointed as the Deputy Leader responsible for economic policies. She was elected as a member of parliament for İzmir's second electoral district at the June 2015 general election.

See also
List of Turkish academics

References

External links
MP profile at the Grand National Assembly website
https://twitter.com/selinsayekboke

Living people
1972 births
Contemporary Republican People's Party (Turkey) politicians
Bentley University faculty
Academic staff of Bilkent University
Deputies of Izmir
Duke University alumni
Georgetown University faculty
Members of the 25th Parliament of Turkey
Members of the 26th Parliament of Turkey
Middle East Technical University alumni
American people of Turkish descent
Politicians from Buffalo, New York
Turkish economists
Turkish women academics
21st-century Turkish women politicians
Turkish Arab people
Members of the Greek Orthodox Church of Antioch
American emigrants to Turkey